Early Bluff is a high bluff on the south side of the Kohler Range in Marie Byrd Land, Antarctica. It stands at the east side of Kohler Glacier at the point where this distributary drains northward from Smith Glacier. It was mapped by the United States Geological Survey from surveys and U.S. Navy air photos, 1959–66, and was named by the Advisory Committee on Antarctic Names after Thomas O. Early, a United States Antarctic Research Program geologist with the Marie Byrd Land Survey Party, 1966–67.

References 

Cliffs of Marie Byrd Land